Bas Takken (born 3 July 1999) is a Dutch Paralympic swimmer who represents the Netherlands in international level competitions.

Career
Takken represented the Netherlands at the 2020 Summer Paralympics in the 400 metre freestyle S10 event and won a silver medal. He also competed in the 200 metre individual medley SM10 event and won a bronze medal.

References

External links
 

1999 births
Living people
People from Hoorn
Dutch male freestyle swimmers
Dutch male medley swimmers
Medalists at the World Para Swimming European Championships
Medalists at the World Para Swimming Championships
Paralympic swimmers of the Netherlands
Swimmers at the 2016 Summer Paralympics
Swimmers at the 2020 Summer Paralympics
Medalists at the 2020 Summer Paralympics
Paralympic silver medalists for the Netherlands
Paralympic bronze medalists for the Netherlands
Paralympic medalists in swimming
S10-classified Paralympic swimmers
Sportspeople from North Holland
21st-century Dutch people